The Mi Oya is a  long river, in North Western of Sri Lanka. It is the fifteenth-longest river in Sri Lanka. It begins in Saliyagama and flows northwest, emptying into the Indian Ocean thru Puttalam.

Its catchment area receives approximately 1,596 million cubic metres of rain per year, and approximately 3 percent of the water reaches the sea. It has a catchment area of 1,024 square kilometres.

References 

Bodies of water of Puttalam District
Rivers of Sri Lanka